Bezenšek Spur (‘Bezenshekov Rid’ \'be-zen-she-kov 'rid\) is the 5.5 km long and 800 m wide rocky ridge rising to 665 m in the northeast foothills of Detroit Plateau on southern Trinity Peninsula in Graham Land, Antarctica.  It is projecting from the southeast side of Povien Bluff eastwards between Marla Glacier and Diplock Glacier.

The feature is named after the Slovene-Bulgarian linguist Anton Bezenšek (1854-1915) who developed the stenographic system for the Bulgarian language.

Location

Maps
 Antarctic Digital Database (ADD). Scale 1:250000 topographic map of Antarctica. Scientific Committee on Antarctic Research (SCAR). Since 1993, regularly upgraded and updated.

Notes

References
 Bezenšek Spur. SCAR Composite Antarctic Gazetteer.
 Bulgarian Antarctic Gazetteer. Antarctic Place-names Commission. (details in Bulgarian, basic data in English)

External link
 Bezenšek Spur. Adjusted Copernix satellite image

Mountains of Trinity Peninsula
Bulgaria and the Antarctic